Tarenna drummondii is a species of plant in the family Rubiaceae. It is found mainly in Kenya and Tanzania in East Africa.

References

drummondii
Vulnerable plants
Taxonomy articles created by Polbot
Taxa named by Diane Mary Bridson